Pseudochondrostoma willkommii is a species of cyprinid fish. It is found in Portugal and Spain. Its natural habitats are rivers and water storage areas. It is threatened by habitat loss.

References 

 

Pseudochondrostoma
Cyprinid fish of Europe
Endemic fish of the Iberian Peninsula
Fish described in 1866
Taxonomy articles created by Polbot